Plumb Bob Point is a tapering rock point, 4 nautical miles (7 km) northeast of Knobhead, marking the northeast extremity of Quartermain Mountains, Victoria Land, and the point of apposition of the east-flowing Taylor Glacier and Ferrar Glacier. The name is one of a group in the area associated with surveying applied in 1993 by the New Zealand Geographic Board (NZGB).

References

Headlands of Victoria Land
McMurdo Dry Valleys